Osteochondromatosis is a condition involving a proliferation of osteochondromas.

Types include:
 Hereditary multiple exostoses
 Synovial osteochondromatosis

References

External links 

Osseous and chondromatous neoplasia